SMS G39 was a 1913 Type Large Torpedo Boat (Großes Torpedoboot) of the Imperial German Navy (Kaiserliche Marine) during World War I, and the 15th ship of her class.

Construction
Built by Germaniawerft in Kiel, Germany, she was commissioned in August 1915.  The "G" in G39 refers to the shipyard at which she was constructed.

Service
G39 was assigned to the High Seas Fleet of the Kaiserliche Marine when she participated in the Battle of Jutland. She served as the leader of the First Torpedo Boat Flotilla in this action under the command of Commander Conrad Albrecht.
 
After the end of hostilities, G39 was interned at Scapa Flow and scuttled.  
One of the crew members on her last voyage was Leopold Bürkner, who later became head of foreign affairs intelligence during the Third Reich. He was interned until 29 January 1920.

The boat was salvaged by Ernest Cox on 3 July 1925.

References

  Technical specs of the Großes Torpedoboot 1913 class

Torpedo boats of the Imperial German Navy
1915 ships
Ships built in Kiel
World War I torpedo boats of Germany
World War I warships scuttled at Scapa Flow
Maritime incidents in 1919